Aida Mahmudova is an Azerbaijani artist. She is best known for being founder of YARAT Contemporary Art Space.

Early life and education
Mahmudova was born on 10 January 1982 in Baku. In 2006, she graduated from Central Saint Martins College of Art and Design in London with a BA Degree in Fine Art.

Career
In 2011, she founded YARAT, a not-for-profit contemporary art organisation based in Baku, Azerbaijan. Since 2012, Mahmudova has been Director of the Baku Museum of Modern Art. Same year she founded YAY Gallery, a social enterprise which is now operating as ARTIM Project Space. She works in installation, sculpture and painting to capture forgotten and marginal corners of her rapidly modernising country. She has participated in exhibitions with other artists and her works have been exhibited internationally. In 2015, she had her first solo exhibition ‘Passing By’ in the US at the Leila Heller Gallery. Mahmudova's work has been shown at the 55th Venice Biennale for the group exhibition Love Me, Love Me Not (2013) and at the 56th Venice Biennale at the exhibition Vita Vitale curated by Artwise (2015). In 2021, her work was presented alongside others in the "Safar: Journey in the Middle East" exhibition by historian Farian Sabahi in Parma, Italy, showing the Middle East in the year before significant conflicts in the area began.

Style
Aida Mahmudova's works has been exhibited internationally and uses a variety of techniques and media. Despite a varied practice, the artist’s main focus remains her exploration of material as a tool for experimenting with and navigating the world she inhabits.

Early on in her work, Mahmudova developed a curiosity towards material, which manifested itself through experimentation with light, color and matter in her landscapes and semi-abstract canvases. As her paintings became increasingly more layered, the artist expanded her practice into the three-dimensional, applying the same approach to sculpture and creating environments both emotive and intense. She continually mixes layer upon layer of diverse material, such as paper, clay, paint, cement, stone, and, more recently, epoxy resin and untreated marble.

Mahmudova’s choice of colour is various. Her artworks show good understanding of colour matching. She can use thick, high contrast colour to create energetic, colourful paintings. She seldom uses bright tone of the colour. For example, her ‘Rambling Vine, 2015’ demonstrates her use of thick, dry layer of pigment to create the rough texture. And she tends to tone down the bright colour like typical yellow to be macaroon yellow mixed with pickle green and grey.

These mixture of colour is cohesive to her paint brushes, bold and yet non-systematic or formulated. It could be interpreted as struggling against rules. In ’The Neighbours’ and ‘The Fountain’, she do not limited herself using thick texture to express herself. She would use wet, low contrast, dripping liquid paints through the heights of canvas to express sense of melancholy. Both textured and loose formed artworks suggested the same idea, Aida do not want to limit her paintings so that most of her works cannot find a clear cut outline of objects. “Memory is the material of my work.” – Aida Mahmudova often applied this brief but very precise analysis on her own art pieces.”

What makes her artworks so blurry and dreamy is her memories cannot be displayed exactly. “My art is a constant and continued investigation of my memory, as it informs my identity. The touchstone of this search and the main source of my inspiration are the forgotten, untouched, and undeveloped locations in Azerbaijan. Our physical world is shifting at a pace so rapid that our memories are frequently blurred, and our ‘remembered’ past is often forgotten or altered by our subconscious.” There are uncertainties in betweens. “Aida Mahmudova’s artwork delves into the emotive facets of ‘longing’ – specifically, the longing for the memory of a place, rather than for the place itself. The artist simultaneously meditates on how memory is tied to the debris of the past. Her paintings and other works present history as a collection of mementos, which appear fragmented and partial, and are accessible only through the mediation of personal perceptions and emotional responses.”

Personal life 
Aida Mahmudova currently lives and works in Baku, Azerbaijan. She is married and has 2 children.

Artworks
Most of the art work done by Mahmudova is inspired by the landscapes and the built environment. In 2012, her work “recycled” was exhibited in the 012 Baku Public Art Festival.

Solo exhibitions
In 2015, Mahmudova had her first solo exhibition "Passing by" in the United States. In this exhibition, the seven paintings were displayed. The theme of the paintings was inspired by her previous work. Also, it is inspired by the built environment and the landscapes of her living space.
In 2021 presented the artist’s second solo-show in the United States – PASTPRESENTSFUTURE in Sapar Contemporary Gallery, New York, USA
In 2022, her 'Liminality' show opened at the Gazelli Gallery in Mayfair, London, curated by art-writer Alistair Hicks.
In November 2022, Aida Mahmudova presented Heaven Can Wait solo exhibition project at Zurab Tsereteli Museum of Modern Art, Tbilisi, Georgia

Group exhibitions

2012
 012 Baku Public Art Festival, Baku, Azerbaijan
 Merging Bridges, Baku Museum of Modern Art (MOMA), Baku, Azerbaijan
 Fly To Baku. Contemporary Art from Azerbaijan (Traveling exhibition), Hotel Salomon de Rothschild, Paris, France; Phillips de Pury & Company, London, UK
 Foreword, Alternative Art Space of YARAT, Baku, Azerbaijan

2013
 Love Me, Love Me Not: Contemporary Art from Azerbaijan and its Neighbors, Curated by Dina Nasser-Khadivi, Heydar Aliyev Center, Baku, Azerbaijan
 Love Me, Love Me Not, Curated by Dina Nasser-Khadivi, Collateral Event for the 55th Venice Biennale, Venice, Italy
 Home Sweet Home, Azerbaijan Cultural Center, Paris, France
 Home Sweet Home, Baku Museum of Modern Art (MOMA), Baku, Azerbaijan
 Fly To Baku. Contemporary Art from Azerbaijan (Traveling exhibition), Kunsthistorisches Museum, Neue Burg, Vienna, Austria
 Spazio D – MAXXI building, National Museum of XXI Century Arts, Rome, Italy; Multimedia Art Museum, Moscow, Russia; me Collectors Room, Berlin, Germany

2014
 Here…Today, Old Sorting Office, London, UK
 Poetics of the Ordinary, Vienna Art Fair, The New Contemporary, Vienna, Austria

2015
 Vita Vitale, Curated by ArtWise, 56th Venice Biennale, Venice, Italy
 Making Histories, YARAT Contemporary Art Centre, Baku, Azerbaijan
 Exploring Inward, Louise Blouin Foundation, London, UK

2016 

 300 Words on Resistance, YARAT, Baku, Azerbaijan
 Art Dubai, YAY Gallery Stand F8, Madinat Jumeirah, Dubai, UAE
 Art Paris Fair, YAY Gallery Booth G6, Grand Palais, Paris, France

2017 

 Between the Sea and Mountains, YAY Gallery, Baku, Azerbaijan

2018 

 Bodily Landscapes, YAY Gallery, Baku, Azerbaijan

2019 

 Starry Skies, Traveling exhibition, Azerbaijan regions
 Живопись, Baku Museum of Modern Art (MoMA), Baku, Azerbaijan

2020 

 Fogs Turned Into Epic Story In My Head, YARAT Centre, Baku, Azerbaijan

2021 

 Safar: Journey in the Middle East, Spazio A, Parma, Italy

Awards
 2015: Luxury Lifestyle 2015 - CHELEBI Furniture & Decor

References

1982 births
Living people
Alumni of Central Saint Martins
Artists from Baku
21st-century Azerbaijani women artists
Museum directors
Women museum directors